Barreiras is a small Portuguese village located in Peral, Cadaval, in the Lisbon district.

Its population is around 110 inhabitants, all over the village, but its center has just around 60.

References 

Villages in Portugal
Cadaval